The Alikovo Regional Literary and Local Lore Museum is a historical and literary Museum of The Alikovsky District of the Chuvash Republic.

History 
Many selfless work in the opening of the Museum was invested by honored workers of culture of the Chuvash Republic Guriy Konstantinovich Terentev, Valerian Stepanov and other patriots of his native land and enthusiasts of Museum and local history, the community of the district took an active part in the formation of this center of culture.

Structure 
The Museum presents monuments of material and spiritual culture of riding Chuvash. It hosts extracurricular school classes, local history readings, meetings with veterans of labor and war, organizes evenings dedicated to the anniversary of the noble people of the region and Chuvashia as a whole.

The exhibitions of books and exhibits devoted to the life and work of I. Yakovlev, the legendary hero of the civil war V. I. Chapaev, the heroes of the great Patriotic war, as well as exhibitions of ancient national costumes are especially popular here.

For a small, by Museum standards, the life of the Alikovo center of historical culture has become very popular among the population of the district, Chuvashia and guests of the Republic.

Alikovo literary Museum today is an established historical and cultural centre of the Chuvash Republic, the focus of moral education of the population.

Literature 
 Л. И. Ефимов, «Элĕк Енĕ» (Аликовский край), Аликово, 1994.
 «Аликовская энциклопедия», редколлегия: Ефимов Л. А., Ефимов Е. Л., Ананьев А. А., Терентьев Г. К., Чебоксары, 2009, .
 «Аликовскому району 75 лет», под ред. Ефимова Л. А., Чебоксары, 2002.

External links 
 In the Alikovo Museum opened the exhibition " Embroidery for the soul»
 Элӗкри литературӑпа таврапӗлӳ музейӗнче тӗрӗ куравӗ уҫӑлнӑ

Museums in Chuvashia
Local museums in Russia
1985 establishments in Russia
Objects of cultural heritage of Russia of regional significance
Cultural heritage monuments in Chuvashia
Literary museums in Russia